The 2012–13 Coppa Italia Lega Pro was the 41st edition of the competition that involving teams from Lega Pro in Italian football.

Format and Seeding
Teams entered the competition at various stages, as follows:
 Group phase: the 42 clubs that not take place to 2012–13 Coppa Italia will be divided into 14 groups of 3 teams. Each team plays every other team of his group once, and the winner of each groups and best 7 runner-up will qualify for the next phase.
 Final phase:
First round: the 21 teams that qualify from the previous phase and the 27 teams that take place to Coppa Italia will dispute one-legged fixtures.
Second round: the 24 winner from the previous round will play another one-legged fixtures.
Third round: the 12 survivors will be divided in 4 groups of 3 teams. Each team plays every other team of his group once, and the winner of each groups will qualify for the next phase.
 Semifinals and Final: the 4 survivor teams will be played the two legged semifinals and final.

Group phase

Group A

Group B

Group C

Group D

Group E

Group F

Group G

Group H

Group I

Group L

Group M

Group N

Group O

Group P

Best runner-up

Final phase

First round
The draw for the first round was made on 22 September and the matches was played on 3 October 2012

Second round
The draw for the second round was made on 5 October and the matches was played on 17 October 2012

Third round
The draw for the third round was made on 19 October and the matches will be played between 07-21 November and 5 December  2012

Group A

Group B

Group C

Group D

Semifinals
The first legs were played on 27 January and 24 February, and the second legs will be played on 27 February and 13 March 2013.

Final

References

External links 
 

2012-13
Coppa Italia Lega Pro
Italy